The 1872 Louisiana gubernatorial election was the second election to take place under the Louisiana Constitution of 1868. As a result of this election William Pitt Kellogg was elected Governor of Louisiana, but not before federal troops stepped in to enforce his election. The results of this election were highly contentious and resulted in racial violence across the state, including the Colfax massacre. U. S. President Ulysses S. Grant had to step in and formally recognize Kellogg as Governor to resolve the violence. Kellogg's Democratic opponent John McEnery finally conceded the election in September 1874 after briefly overthrowing Kellogg's government.

Results
Popular Vote

References

1872
Gubernatorial
Louisiana
November 1872 events